Bistrița Monastery is a Romanian Orthodox monastery located in Bistrița village, Costești Commune, Vâlcea County, Romania.

Initially built between 1492 and 1494 by the Craiovești boyars, it was destroyed in 1509 by Mihnea cel Rău and subsequently rebuilt between 1515 and 1519 by the Craiovești. The monastery was rebuilt for a third time between 1846 and 1855, following the damage sustained during the 1838 earthquake. The new church was painted by Gheorghe Tattarescu.

External links
 Monastery's page on the official website of the Archbishopric of Râmnic

Religious buildings and structures completed in 1494
Historic monuments in Vâlcea County
Romanian Orthodox monasteries of Vâlcea County
Christian monasteries established in the 15th century
1490s establishments in Romania